Dolno Orehovo is a village in the municipality of Novaci, North Macedonia.

Demographics
According to the 2002 census, the village had a total of 45 inhabitants. Ethnic groups in the village include:

Macedonians 39
Albanians 5
Turks 1

References

External links

Villages in Novaci Municipality